Mark Saxelby (4 January 1969 – 12 October 2000) was an English cricketer. He was a left-handed batsman and a right-arm medium-pace bowler.

He started his eleven-year cricketing career at Nottinghamshire, where he enjoyed a fair few successful seasons and consistently averaged in the 30s with the bat without making himself overly known or feared. However, he was soon off to Durham, who spotted him after an excellent century innings in the Sunday leagues. Despite being keen to keep both Mark and his brother Kevin Saxelby for as long as possible, he was to move to Durham and make 181 on his Championship debut for the team.

However, a season after reaching 1000 runs for the first time, Saxelby was once again packing his bags and moving, after patchy form saw him down to number five in the batting lineup.

After some years in minor league cricket, and a 1996 MCC Trophy win for Cheshire, Saxelby was signed by Derbyshire in 2000 and only appeared for them after an injury to Mathew Dowman left his teammate unable to play.

At the age of 31, Saxelby committed suicide by ingesting weedkiller; he was suffering from depression.

References

External links
Mark Saxelby at Cricket Archive

1969 births
2000 suicides
English cricketers
Nottinghamshire cricketers
Durham cricketers
Derbyshire cricketers
Cheshire cricketers
Nottinghamshire Cricket Board cricketers
Cornwall cricketers
Suicides by poison
Suicides in England